This is a list of department stores of the United Kingdom. In the case of department store groups, the location of the flagship store is given. This list does not include large specialist stores, which sometimes resemble department stores. The list is broken into "currently trading" (A–Z); "defunct groups" and "defunct" (A–Z).

Currently trading

A–F

G–O

P–Z

Defunct department store groups

Defunct department stores

A

B

C

D

E

F

G

 A W Gamage (Holborn, London)
 A W Gamage (Oxford Street, London) – opened as new flagship store of A W Gamage of Holborn 1930. Closed 8 months later.Lease sold to C & A.
 A W Gamage (Romford) - opened in Liberty Shopping Centre in 1968. Sold to British Home Stores in 1971.
 Gamis's (Yeovil) – established in 1828 by Ince Gamis as 'perfumer, hairdresser and toy dealer' and traded successively as Ince Gamis, Gamis & Hunt, Gamis & Co. and Gamis's. The business came to be owned by House of Fraser in the 1970s (possibly through a larger acquisition?) and was renamed Dingles before closing in the 1980s. The premises were bought by Denners.
 Gammons (Guildford) – small family run department store based in Surrey and Kent
 Gammons (Woking)
 Gammons (Chobham)
 Gammons (Cranbrook, Kent)
 Gammons (Cranleigh)
 Gardiner's (London) – Based in Whitechapel, destroyed by fire in 1972.
 Gardiner Haskins (Bristol), opened 1825 as a blacksmiths. Now a Home wares business.
 Garlands (Norwich) – Located in London Street. Bought by Debenhams. fire in 1970 destroyed the building and its neighbouring department store Buntings. The building was rebuilt but the store closed in 1984.
 Garratts (Woolwich) – Closed 1972.
 Gayler & Pope (Marylebone)
 Genge & Co. (Dorchester) – Succeeded George Dixon & Jameson 1899. Bought by Army & Navy Stores 1953. Acquired by House of Fraser 1976; renamed Dingles; closed 1980s.
 Gimbles (Liverpool) – American chain based at Great Charlotte Street
 Glass's (Peterborough)
 Henry Glave (New Oxford Street, London) – established 1848; bought by Sir Arthur Wheeler, 1st Baronet, purchased United Drapery Stores; Wheeler was declared bankrupt in 1931; closed 1936
 Godfreys (Lowestoft) – closed 2015; re-opened as Kerry's Home Furnishings.
 Goldbergs (Glasgow)
 Goodbans (Chiswick) – established 1909; closed 1974
 Frederick Gorringe (Buckingham Palace Road, London) – established 1858; bought by Gresham Trust and Charles Neale Investments in 1961; rebuilt 1960s; went into administration 1968.
 Gosling & Sons (Richmond) – Established 1795. Bought by John Barker & Co. 1947. Acquired by House of Fraser 1957; closed 1968; reopened as Dickins & Jones on completion of new building 1970; renamed House of Fraser 2007.
 Bryce Grant (Penge) Opened in 1922 at Central Exchange, merged business with P. D. Rodgers store, before being bought by Walter Cobb. Store was closed in the 1950s business operated by H. E. Olby and Erdington.
 Grant Brothers (Croydon) 1877-1985, latterly of 14–32 High Street, Croydon.
 Grant Warden (Walton-on-Thames) – Formerly Campbell & Booker. Bought by J E Beale; renamed Beales.
 Gravesons (Hertford) – Succeeded Graveson & Robinson 1899; closed 2001.
 Gray Peverell (Hartlepool) opened 1902. Bought by Binns in 1926. Store closed in 1992.
 W S Green (St. Albans) – Bought by Army & Navy Stores.
 Greenlands (Hereford) opened in 1856 by George Greenland. Further stores opened but in 1968 the business was sold to Marks & Spencer for £350,000.
 Edward Grey (Birmingham) – bought by Debenhams
 Edward Grey (Dudley) – opened as a branch of Edward Grey of Birmingham; acquired by Debenhams
 Edward Grey (Leamington Spa) – opened as a branch of Edward Grey of Birmingham; acquired by Debenhams
 Edward Grey (Stourbridge) – opened as a branch of Edward Grey of Birmingham; acquired by Debenhams
 Edward Grey (Walsall) – opened as a branch of Edward Grey of Birmingham; acquired by Debenhams
 Edward Grey (Willenhall) – opened as a branch of Edward Grey of Birmingham; acquired by Debenhams
 Edward Grey (Worcester) – opened as a branch of Edward Grey of Birmingham; acquired by Debenhams
 Grices (Leicester) – succeeded by Rudkin Turner
 Griffin & Spalding (Nottingham) – bought by Debenhams 1944; renamed Debenhams
 Grocott & Co (Shrewsbury) – bought by Hide & Co before the end of World War II; closed mid 1960s
 Grose Brothers (Southwark)
 Gunners (Tonbridge) - demolished 1984.
 Guy & Smith (Grimsby) – bought by House of Fraser 1969; incorporated into the Binns group; renamed Binns 1969; renamed House of Fraser 2000s

H

 Philip Hall (Ripon) – established 1950; closed 2012
 Hamilton & Bell (Cross Gates, Leeds)
 Hamilton & Bell (Evesham) purchased by Owen Owen in 1975
 Hammonds (Hull) – bought by House of Fraser 1972; incorporated into the Binns group; renamed Binns 1972; renamed Hammonds; renamed House of Fraser; closed 2019
 Hammonds (Bridlington) – formerly Carltons. Opened as Hammonds on completion of new building 1970. Subsequently, acquired by House of Fraser 1972; renamed Binns; closed c. 1995. Premises bought by Boyes and reopened in 1998.
 Handleys (Southsea) – Established 1869. Bought by Drapery Trust; incorporated into the Bobby & Co. group; renamed Debenhams 1970s.
 Hanningtons (Brighton)
 Harper Brothers (Balham)
 T J Harries (Oxford Street, London) – established c. 1885 or c. 1887; purchased by John Lewis in 1928
 Harrison Gibson (Ilford) – closed 2010
 Harrison Gibson (Bromley) – Opened as a branch of Harrison Gibson of Ilford. Bought by Army & Navy Stores 1968; renamed Army & Navy. Acquired by House of Fraser 1976; closed 2004. North building now occupied by T K Maxx (2015). South building demolished and site vacant (2015).
 H & D Hart (Leeds) – bought by Matthias Robinson 1938; incorporated into Matthias Robinson Leeds store (now Debenhams) 
 William Harvey (Guildford) – Bought by Army & Navy Stores 1953. Acquired by House of Fraser 1976; renamed Army & Navy; renamed House of Fraser.
 Harwoods (Strood)
 George Hatton (Dover)
 George Henry Havelock (Sunderland) – Destroyed by fire 18 July 1898; rebuilt 1900; closed 1914. Building converted to cinema.
 Havens (Westcliff on Sea) Opened 1901; Store closed in 2017 and moved to being an online retailer only.
 Hawes Brothers (Clapham Junction) – One of the founding members of United Drapery Stores.
 Hawes Brothers (Morden)
 Hawke & Thomas (Newquay) – bought by E Dingle & Co. 1960s
 Hawkins (Hitchin) – opened 1863, closed 2017.
 Haymans (Totnes) – bought by Debenhams; incorporated into the Bobby & Co. group
 Sidney Heath (Swansea)
 Heddles (Dartford)
 Hedley Mitchell (Erith) opened 1890, closed 1961, demolished 1966.
 Hedley, Swan & Co (Sunderland) 1882–1919, renamed Joplings store when purchased by Stephen Moriarty Swan and Robert Hedley. Renamed Joplings when moved to High Street West in 1919.
 Heelas & Sons Co. (Reading) – Established 1854. Bought by Charles Clore 1947; sold to United Drapery Stores 1950. Bought by John Lewis Partnership 1953; business of A H Bull incorporated into Heelas 1953; renamed John Lewis 2001.
 Alexander Henderson (Glasgow) – bought by House of Fraser from Selincourt & Sons of London 1970; closed 1970, enabling the relocation of Pettigrew & Stephens to the site, in the same year
 William Henderson & Sons (Liverpool) – established 1829; bought by Harrods 1949; acquired by House of Fraser 1959; renamed Binns 1975; closed 1977.
 Edwin Henley (Shepton Mallet) – bought by Fear Hill
 Henry's Stores (Manchester) – Opened by Henry Cohen, a Russian immigrant, as clothing stores before his son, Leonard Cohen opened the department store in 1923.  Purchased by British Home Stores in 1968.
 * Henrys Stores (Birmingham)
 Henry's Stores (Stockport) located at 28-30 Princes Street, formerly a cinema before being replaced by a Victor Value supermarket.
 H L Herbert & Co. (Kilburn)
 Herbert Lewis (Chepstow) opened 1878; ceased trading 2018
 Heywoods (Huddersfield) Destroyed by fire on 2 November 1967
 Heyworths (Cambridge) Closed 1965
 Albert Hide & Son (Bexleyheath) – Established 1851; closed 1979. Buildings replaced by Broadway Shopping Centre.
 D Hill, Carter & Company (Hartlepool) – formerly Carter & Co.; merged with D Hill & Co. 1898; bought by Blacketts 1940s
 D Hill, Carter & Company (North Shields) – formerly D Hill & Co.; merged with Carter & Co. 1898
 William Hill (Hills) (Hove) – bought by Debenhams; incorporated into the Bobby & Co. group; closed 1982
 R H O Hills (Blackpool) Bought by Hide & Co. 1965. Acquired by House of Fraser 1975; incorporated into the Binns group; renamed Binns; closed.
 George Hilton & Sons (Haywards Heath) – Established 1882; closed 1980s. Main buildings demolished and site redeveloped as Orchards Shopping Centre. Former furniture building now occupied by Robert Dyas (2015).
 Hinds (Eltham) – One of the founding members of United Drapery Stores.
 George Hitchcock Williams & Co. (St Paul's Churchyard, London) – Established 1841; closed 1984.
 M C Hitchen & Son (Leeds) – sold to Littlewoods in 1952.
 Hoadleys (Burgess Hill) – Established 1857; closed 1983.
 Holdrons (Peckham) – Bought by Selfridge Provincial Stores. Acquired by John Lewis Partnership 1940; sold 1948.
 Hopewells (Nottingham)
 Houndsditch Warehouse (Houndsditch, London) - purchased by Great Universal Stores in 1958. Closed 1986.
 David Hourston & Sons (Ayr) - opened 1897; Purchased by House of Fraser 1949; Rebranded Arnotts; Sold in 1989 to a management buyout led by Murdoch McMaster; Bought by Jebreel family out of administration in 1993 and Rebranded Hourstons; Closed 2019.
 Howards (Newcastle upon Tyne) – Bought by United Drapery Stores; later incorporated into the John Blundell group; renamed John Blundell.
 Harding Howell and Company's Grand Fashionable Magazine (Pall Mall, London) – Opened in 1809, Closed in 1820.
 James Howell & Co. (Cardiff) – bought by House of Fraser 1972
 John K Hubbard (Worthing) – bought by Debenhams; incorporated into the Bobby & Co. group; renamed Debenhams 1973
 T P Hughes (Tenby) – opened 1903, closed as a department store 2017, continues as a homeware store.
 T P Hughes (Carmarthen) opened in 1932, closed 1987.
 T P Hughes (Haverfordwest) opened in 1922.
 Hulburds (Herne Bay and Sittingbourne)
 W H Hunt & Co. (Kensington) – Established 1889; closed 1923. Located at 197–207 Kensington High Street.
 Huntbachs (Hanley)
 Hunt Brothers (Horsham)

J

K

L

M

 McDonalds (Glasgow) Formerly part of retail and manufacturing business, Stewart & McDonald, the retail business was seperated as McDonalds in 1913. In 1922 they purchased the drapery business of E J Clark in Harrogate. The business was bought by House of Fraser in 1951. It was merged with Wylie & Lochhead and together renamed McDonalds, Wylie & Lochhead 1957; renamed Frasers 1975
 McDonalds, Wylie & Lochhead (Glasgow) – formed from the merger of McDonalds and Wylie & Lochhead by House of Fraser 1957; renamed Frasers 1975.
 McGill Brothers (Dundee)
 McIlroy Brothers (Hanley) – established 1883; later McIlroys. Bought by Lewis's 1935; renamed Lewis's
 Mackross (Cardiff)
 Maddox & Co (Shrewsbury) – established in the 1850s by R Maddox. Bought by Owen Owen in 1966; renamed Owen Owen; closed c. 1990
 Maggs (Clifton)
 Makins & Bean (Bridlington) – established c. 1880s; succeeded by Norman Jones & Co.
 David Mann & Sons (Manns of Cranleigh) (Cranleigh) opened in 1887; Closed 2021.
 Marments (Cardiff) – established 1879; closed 1986
 T. C. Marsh & Co (Bristol)
 Marshall Roberts (Camden Town)
 Martins (Canterbury) bought by Chiesmans
 Maskreys (Whiteladies Road, Bristol) – closed 2012
 Masons & Son (Ipswich)
 Mastin Brothers (Hastings) - established 1872. Closed 1969.
 Matthew & Son (Cambridge)
 Frederick Matthews (Preston) – bought by Owen Owen; renamed Owen Owen
 Robert Maule & Son (Edinburgh) – established 1894. Bought by Binns 1934; renamed Binns. Acquired by House of Fraser 1953; renamed Frasers.
 Maw Till Kirke (Hull) – closed 1938; building occupied by municipal offices since 1942
 Mawer & Collingham (Lincoln) – bought by House of Fraser 1980; incorporated into the Binns group; renamed Binns c. 1980; renamed House of Fraser c.2005
 E Mayes & Son (Southampton) – bought by Owen Owen; renamed Owen Owen
 Medhursts (Bromley) – established 1879 by Fred Medhurst; bought by United Drapery Stores 1969; renamed Allders 1979
 Midland Drapery Company (Derby) – established 1882; closed 1969
 C. N. Mitcham (Cambridge)
 Mogridges Torquay Closed early 1970s.
 Monteith, Hamilton & Monteith (Leeds) – established 1885, trading as 'Grand Pygmalion'; closed 1927
 J D Morant (Chichester; previously Southsea) – Established 1910; Southsea premises destroyed by bombing 1941; relocated to Chichester 1941. Bought by Army & Navy Stores 1955; renamed Army & Navy. Acquired by House of Fraser 1976; renamed House of Fraser 2007.
 David Morgan (Cardiff) – established 1879; closed 29 January 2005
 John Morgan & Son (Marlow) – bought by William McIlroy
 J T Morgan (Swansea)
 Morgan Squire (Leicester) – bought by J J Allen 1962; acquired by House of Fraser 1969; renamed Rackhams c. 1976; closed 1980s
 Morgans (Ramsgate)
 Morgans (West Penwith) – bought by James Colmer 1963; closed 1970s
 Morgans (Bristol) – opened in the 1930s; bought by James Colmer in 1963
 Morris (Newport, Isle of Wight) – Formerly Edward Morris. Bought by Chiesmans 1958.
 Mortons (Faringdon)
 Moulton (Ilford)   purchases by R H O Hills 1959; 1962 purchased by Lewis' for £730,000; renamed Selfridges; closed.
 J.W.Muntus (Rotherham)
 Murfitts (Hounslow)
 Murrays (High Wycombe) – Closed 1985.
 Henry A Murton (Newcastle upon Tyne)
 Musgroves (Kendal) Opened in 1860. Became part of J R Taylor, before being purchased by Beales.

N

O

P

 James Page (Camberley) – Established 1904. Bought by United Drapery Stores; renamed Allders c. 1979.
 Denniss Paine & Co. (Maidstone) – bought by Chiesmans 1930; renamed Chiesmans; acquired by House of Fraser; closed c. 1983
 Palmers (Great Yarmouth)
 Palmers (Great Yarmouth)
 Palmers Lowestoft (Lowestoft) – formerly Chadds
 Palmers (Norwich)
 Palmers (Dereham)
 Palmers (Bury St. Edmunds)
 Palmers Stores (Hammersmith) closed 1980s.
 Parkers (Edinburgh) demolished 1970s to make way for expansion of Edinburgh University.
 J T Parrish (Byker) – Established 1875; closed 1984.
 Parson & Hart (Andover, Hampshire) bought by Army & Navy in 1965, store sold to Woolworths.
 Parson & Hart (Bromley) purchased from P Martin in 1940.
 Pauldens (Manchester) – Established 1860s. Bought by Debenhams 1928; rebuilt 1930; destroyed by fire 1957; relocated to Drilll Hall 1957; relocated to Rylands Warehouse building 1959; renamed Debenhams 1973.
 Pauldens (Sheffield) – Opened by Debenhams as a branch of Pauldens of Manchester; renamed Debenhams 1973.
 Pearsons (Bishop's Stortford) – Opened as a branch of Pearsons of Enfield 1972 in premises formerly occupied by H Sparrow. Bought by Morleys Stores 2010; closed 2012.
 Pearsons (Wood Green, London) – Opened as a branch of Pearsons of Enfield. Closed prior to sale to Morles and now a Primark.
 Pearson Brothers (Nottingham) – Established 1889; later Pearsons.
 Joseph Peck (Rotherham & branches) – small Yorkshire chain with branches in:
 Joseph Peck (Barnsley)
 Joseph Peck (Sheffield)
 Joseph Peck (Worksop)
 Pendleburys (Wigan) – bought by Debenhams 1948; renamed Debenhams 1973
 Penningtons (Spalding) Opened in 1850 by Charles Pennington. Destroyed during World War II bombing raid in 1941. Store rebuilt, became part of H E Keightley & Son but closed in 1969.
 Penrith Co-operative Society (Penrith) – non-food departments closed 2015
 Pettigrew & Stephens (Glasgow)
 Pettits (Kensington) – established 1890; closed 1978; located at 191–195 Kensington High Street
 Pettits (Wallingford) - purchased by John Saders of Ealing in 1985.
 Gray Peverell & Co. (West Hartlepool) – Established 1902. Bought by Binns 1926; renamed Binns. Acquired by House of Fraser 1953; closed 1992.
Philpotts (St Leonards-on-Sea)
 Plattens (Great Yarmouth and Gorleston-on-Sea) – established 1876; closed 1998
 William Plumpton & Son (Bury St Edmunds) – Bought by Palmers in 1961; renamed Palmers.
 John Polglase (Penzance) – bought by E Dingle & Co. 1960s.
  Pollecoffs (Pwllheli) – had branches in Caernarfon and Holyhead. No longer a department store, now operates as a ladies fashion boutique.
 Ponting Brothers (Kensington) – Bought by John Barker & Co. 1907. Acquired by House of Fraser 1957; closed 1970.
 Pophams Plymouth – Opened in 1824 as Pophams & Radford before the Radford element was dropped in 1931.  Bought out by Dingles in 1962 and closed shortly after.
 The Poplar Stores Wealdstone
 W F Potts (Dartford)
 Pratts (Bingley) – bought by Brown Muff; renamed Brown Muff; acquired by House of Fraser
 Pratts (Streatham) – Established 1867. Bought by Bon Marché 1920. Acquired by Selfridge Provincial Stores 1926. Subsequently, acquired by John Lewis Partnership 1940; closed 1990.
 Priors (Finchley) – bought by Owen Owen
 Pugh Brothers (Llanelli)
 Pullman & Sons (Nottingham)
 Pyne Brothers (Deptford)

Q

R

 Rackham & Co (Birmingham) – Established 1881, became part of Harrods 1955, later House of Fraser 1959.
 A L Ramsay (Elgin) – Established 1845, later A L Ramsay & Son. Bought by Benzie & Miller; renamed Benzie & Miller. Acquired by House of Fraser; renamed Arnotts; closed.
 Ranbys (Derby) Opened in 1871 by Mary & Harry Ranby at 24 Victoria Street. By 1880 they had stores in Victoria and Queen Street. The Ranbys neices, the Ward sisters took over the business in 1917, but sold it to a Welsh company about 1939. In 1962 the store was rebuilt. It was bought by Debenhams and renamed Debenhams in 1973. Debenhams closed the store and relocated in 2007.
 Randalls (Uxbridge) – Established 1891; closed 31 January 2015.
 Rankin & Co. (Banff) – Bought by Benzie & Miller; renamed Benzie & Miller. Acquired by House of Fraser 1958; renamed Arnotts 1970s; closed 1980s.
 H L Reid (Epsom) – bought by Great Northern & Southern Stores and Wright Brothers in 1938. Company became part of Hide & Co after the reverse takeover of Great Northern & Southern Stores and Wrights. The registered office of H L Reid was changed to the address of Seccombes department store in Cardiff, though the business only ever traded at Epsom. House of Fraser bought Hide & Co in 1975. H L Reid was renamed Chiesmans and closed in 1984.
 Reid & Pearson (Aberdeen) - Opened 1905. Purchased by Scottish Drapery in 1949. In 1952 became part of House of Fraser. Closed 1955.
 Reynolds (Newport, Wales) – bought by Owen Owen; renamed Owen Owen
 Reynolds (Cardiff) – Opened as a branch of Reynolds of Newport. Bought by James Howell & Co.
 Ricemans (Canterbury; previously Deal, Kent) – Relocated from Deal to purpose-built Canterbury store 1960s. Bought by Fenwick 1986; renamed Fenwick on relocation to new building 2003.
 Rightons (Evesham) – bought by Hide & Co.; acquired by House of Fraser; closed 1975
 Robbs (Birkenhead) – established 1872; closed 1982
 J Robb & Co (Belfast) - Opened in 1861. Purchased by Great Universal Stores in 1951. Closed in 1973.
 Evan Roberts (Cardiff) – Opened 1890. Closed 1983. Building demolished 1985.
 J R Roberts (Stratford)
 J R Roberts (Southend-on-Sea) – opened as a branch of J R Roberts of Stratford
 T R Roberts (Islington) Started in 1862, the business started as a drapers by John and Thomas Reynold Roberts, with the partnership ending in 1870. A company was created to buy the shares of the business in 1895, with Thomas Roberts retiring in 1896. The store became a full department store after purchasing rival draper, Matthew Henry Rackstraw. The store became part of Hide & Co in 1946.
 W J Roberts & Sons (Truro) – formerly Bon Marché
 Roberts Brothers (Sheffield) – In September 1896 two enterprising young brothers Charles and Arnold Roberts opened Rockingham House in The Moor. The store grew but was destroyed during World War II, with temporary stores opened in Eccleshall and London Road. The new building partially opened in 1955, fully opening in 1960. The store merged with neighbouring furniture store, Eyres, with the business closing during the 70s.
 Robinsons (Woking) – established 1934; closed 1997
 Robinson Brothers (Carlisle) – established 1889; bought by Binns 1933; renamed Binns; acquired by House of Fraser 1953; renamed House of Fraser c. 2000
 Robinson Brothers (Dumfries) – opened as a branch of Robinson Brothers of Carlisle; acquired by Binns 1933; renamed Binns; subsequently acquired by House of Fraser 1953; closed c. 1994
 J F Rockhey (Torquay) – bought by D H Evans. Acquired by Harrods; subsequently acquired by House of Fraser 1959; incorporated into the Dingles group c. 1972; renamed Dingles c. 1972; closed 1980s
 J F Rockhey (Newton Abbot) – opened as a branch of J F Rockhey of Torquay; acquired by D H Evans; subsequently acquired by Harrods; subsequently acquired by House of Fraser 1959
 P. D. Rogers (Penge) merged with Bryce Grant
 E P Rose (Bedford) Opened in 1838 when Edward Paine Rose's father purchased an existing drapers at 51 High Street. The business moved across the road to 50 High Street before expanding to take in no. 46 to 52. The business stayed in the Rose family until the 1960s when it was bought by Debenhams, being renamed Debenhams in the 1970s.
 Matthew Rose & Sons (Hackney) – established 1868; closed 1936; premises sold to Marks & Spencer
 Roslings (Brighton) – Opened at no. 31 London Road in 1905 before extending in 1932. Store closed in 1960 being purchased by Woolworths who opened their new store in 1965.
 Rossiter & Son (Paignton) First Rossiter drapery store was opened by Srah and Jane Rossiter at Winner Street in 1858. By 1888 the store had moved to Palace Avenue.  In 1934 the business became a limited company, and reached its 150th anniversary in 2008, but closed in January 2009.
 Jeremiah Rotherham & Co (Shoreditch) – established 1860; building destroyed by bombing 1941; closed 1941
 Rowans (Glasgow) opened 1846 in Buchanan Street specialising in men's clothing and sports equipment. Purchased by Austin Reed in 1974.
 William Rowe (Gosport) – bought by William McIlroy
 W. Rowntree & Sons (Scarborough) – established 1881
 F H Rowse (West Ealing) - purchased John Sanders in Ealing. Closed F H Rowse in 1980s.
 Rudkin Turner (Leicester) – Succeeded Grices.
 Rushworths (Huddersfield)
 Russell & Dorrell (Worcester) – established 1834; department store closed 2003; furniture store closed 2011

S

 Salts Brothers (Swadlincote) – established 1895; closed 1982
 Arthur Sanders (Darlington) – Established 1770. Bought by Binns 1922; renamed Binns. Acquired by House of Fraser 1953. Now only surviving store to retain the Binns name (2015).
 John Sanders (Ealing) - founded 1865 as a drapers, purchased Lyttons in Ruislip, FW Rouse in West Ealing and Pettits in Wallingford. Ealing store was sold to Marks & Spencers in 1990. Business continues at Ruislip.
 Eldred Sayers & Sons (Ealing) – Bought by Bentalls in 1950; renamed Bentalls; relocated. Acquired by Fenwick. Bought by J E Beale from Fenwick; renamed Beales; closed.
 Robert Sayle (Cambridge) – Established 1840. Bought by Selfridge Provincial Stores 1934. Acquired by John Lewis Partnership 1940; renamed John Lewis 2007.
 Robert Sayle (Peterborough) – succeeded Thomsons as a branch of Robert Sayle of Cambridge; destroyed by fire and closed 1956
 Seccombes (Cardiff) – established 1895; bought by Hide & Co. 1955; acquired by House of Fraser 1975; closed 1977
 Sheltons (Peterborough)
 Sherriff & Ward (Winchester) – bought by Debenhams; renamed Debenhams
 Shinners (Sutton) – One of the founders of United Drapery Stores
 Shirers & Lances (Cheltenham) – closed 1970s
 James Shoolbred (Tottenham Court Road, London)
 Shrubsoles (Kingston-upon-Thames) - started by William Shrubsole and Henry Knight. Shrubsole was a partner in a bank which became part of National Westminster Bank. Store was sold to Joseph Hide, becoming Hide & Co in 1873. Eventually became a Chiesmans after the House of Fraser purchase, before being branded an Army & Navy. Closed 1987.
 Simes (Worcester) – bought by Debenhams; incorporated into the Bobby & Co. group; renamed Debenhams
 Sinclairs (Belfast) – closed in 1972
 Charles Sloper & Sons (Devizes) established 1690; half of store to Woolworths in 1933; store closed 1974.
 William Small & Sons (Edinburgh) – bought by House of Fraser; closed
 J C Smith (Nuneaton) – bought by Debenhams; renamed Debenhams 1972
 J C Smith (Bedworth) – opened as a branch of J C Smith of Nuneaton; acquired by Debenhams; closed
 J C Smith (Stratford-upon-Avon) – opened as a branch of J C Smith of Nuneaton; acquired by Debenhams; renamed Debenhams 1972
 R J Smiths (Aberdeen) purchased by House of Fraser 1981
 Smith Brothers (Dundee)
 Smith Brothers (Tooting) – bought by Morleys of Brixton; renamed Morleys 2010
 Snowball & Son (Gateshead)
 Somertons (Harrow)
 Sopers (Brighton) - Opened 1860 by Samuel Henry Soper; Closed 1920s replaced by Leesons.
 Sopers (Harrow) – bought by Debenhams
 Soutars (Arbroath) – bought by House of Fraser; renamed Arnotts; closed
 Henry Sparrow (Bishop Stortford) Started as Sworders Ironmongery store during the mid 1800s in North Street. In 1904 it was bought by the stores clerk, Henry Sparrow. His family grew it into Bishop Stortford's only department store. In 1971 the business was sold by auction to Pearsons of Enfield. Pearsons was sold to Morleys Stores in 2010, with the Bishop Stortford store closed in 2012.
 John Speed (Rotherham)
 James Spence & Co. (St Paul's Churchyard, London)
 Spencer Turner & Boldero (Lisson Grove, London) – established 1837; closed 1969
 Henry Spokes (Hackney)
 Spooners (Plymouth) – opened in 1837; bought by Debenhams in 1929; merged with John Yeo and together renamed Debenhams in 1977.
 St. Cuthbert's Co-operative Society (Edinburgh) Opened first store 1859. Department store in Bread Street in 1892. Merged with Dalziel Society of Motherwell to form Scotmid in 1981.
 Staddons (Nottingham) – department store closed; now a specialist bedroom furniture store (2015).
 Staddons (Plaistow) – Bought by Drapery Trust; ownership subsequently transferred to Debenhams; sold. Closed.
 Staffords (Brighton)
 Stanleys (Birmingham) – bought by Debenhams c. 1945
 Steele (Dorchester) – established 1842; succeeded by George Dixon & Jameson 1889
 T B Stephens (Stoke Newington) – closed 1973
 Stewart & McDonald (Glasgow) The Department Store of a manufacturing business that started in 1826. The retail business was seperated in 1913.
 Stones (Romford) – established 1864; bought by Debenhams 1960; renamed Debenhams
 Strange & Atkinson (Eastbourne) – bought by Bobby & Co.
 Stringers (Stourbridge) – bought by Owen Owen; renamed Owen Owen; closed 1990.
 Style & Gerrish (Salisbury) Opened in 1803 by John Style & John Large as Style & Large as wholesale linen drapers. By 1863 George Gerrish had replaced John Large, and the company name was changed. The business was bought by Debenhams in 1972; renamed Debenhams
 Suters (Slough) – bought by Owen Owen; renamed Owen Owen
 Suters (Uxbridge) – opened as a branch of Suters of Slough; acquired by Owen Owen; renamed Owen Owen
 J K Swallow & Sons (Chesterfield)
 George Swan (North Shields) – bought by Shephards of Gateshead; renamed Shephards
 Swan & Edgar (Piccadilly Circus) – closed 1982
 W H Sweet (Maryland Point)

T

 William Tarn & Co (Elephant and Castle) – opened c. 1799
 Fred Taylor (Yeovil) – opened 1913. Purchased by Plummer Roddis in 1940s.
 Frederick Taylor & Son (Lambeth)
 Joshua Taylor (Cambridge) - closed 1990s.
 J R Taylor (St Annes-on-Sea) – established 1901. Purchased Blackburn firm Mabel Stevenson in the 1950s. closed 2015.
 J R Taylor (Bolton) formerly Whiteheads
 W M Taylor (Erdington) – bought by Owen Owen; renamed Owen 
 W M Taylor (Kings Heath)
 W M Taylor (Sutton Coldfield)
 Taylors (Basildon) – bought by House of Fraser 1979; incorporated into the Army & Navy group; renamed Army & Navy; closed 1990s
 Taylors (Clifton) – bought by Debenhams; renamed Debenhams
 The House That Jack Built (Aston)
 Thomas Brothers (Southend-on-Sea)
 B Thomas (Helston) – bought by E Dingle & Co. 1960s
 W C Thompson trading as Liverpool House (Sunderland) Opened 1867.
 Patrick Thomson (Edinburgh) – bought by Scottish Drapery Corporation; acquired by House of Fraser; renamed Arnotts 1975; closed
 Thomsons (Peterborough) – bought by Selfridge Provincial Stores; acquired by John Lewis Partnership 1940; renamed Robert Sayle; destroyed by fire and closed 1956
 Thornton Varley (Hull) – originally R Thornton, bought by Debenhams in 1953; renamed Debenhams 1970s.
 Thurman & Malin (Derby) - opened 1879, closed 1970.
 J H Tobys (Nottingham) opened 1929 by James And Florence Hartley. Toby was James' nickname. The business was sold to Grant-Warden of Walton on Thames in 1968 when Florence died. It closed in 1982.
 Treron et Cie (Glasgow) – established 1896 by Walter Wilson
 Trewin Brothers (Watford) – Bought by Selfridge Provincial Stores 1918. Acquired by John Lewis Partnership 1940.
 Trippetts (Bradford) – Established 1887.
 Thomas Tucker (Exmouth) – Established 1801. Bought by Benzie family, of Benzie & Miller, 1958; closed 2007.
 Tudor Williams (New Malden) opened 1919, closed 2019.Dorking site operates a bed shop.
 Tuttles (Lowestoft) – Bought by Debenhams c. 1960; sold c. 1973. Closed.
 Tyrers (St Helens) – Closed in 2016.
 Tyrrell & Green (Southampton) – Established 1897. Bought by John Lewis Partnership 1934; renamed John Lewis on relocation to new building 2000.

U

V

W

 Wades (Brighton) – Opened on 1890s, store rebuilt 1930, bought by Owen Owen in 1975.
 Thomas Wallis & Co. (Holborn Circus, London)
 John Walsh (Sheffield) – Bought by Harrods. Acquired by House of Fraser 1959; renamed Rackhams 1970s; renamed House of Fraser 1980s; closed 1998.
 Walter Brothers (Worthing) - opened 1846; based in South Street; Closed 1971.
 Waltons (Exeter) – Opened 1905. Closed in 1972. Now part of Marks and Spencer site.
 Waltons (Exmouth) – Closed in 1982.
 E L Ward (Cheltenham)
 Wards (Seven Sisters) opened 1901, closed 1972. Still knownlocally as Ward's Corner.
 Henry Warren & Son (Newton Abbot) – bought by E Dingle & Co. 1960s
 Warwick House (Birmingham) Opened in 1839 as Birmingham's first department store. Became part of Marshall & Snelgrove.
 Warwick House (Malvern) Opened in 1842, closing in 1992.
 Waterloo House (Newcatle upon Tyne) - based in Thornton Road.
 Watt & Grant (Aberdeen)
 Waymarks (Tunbridge Wells) – bought by Chiesmans
 J C Webber & Sons (Maidenhead) purchased by Great Universal Stores.
 Webbers (Oxford) – Succeeded City Drapery Stores 1905. Bought by Hide & Co. 1952; closed 1971.
 Weekes (Tunbridge Wells) – Bought by Hoopers; renamed Hoopers.
 Wellsteeds (Reading) – Opened 1870.Bought by Debenhams; renamed Debenhams in 1973.
 Welwyn Department Store (Welwyn Garden City) – Established 1939 replacing Welwyn Stores which opened in 1921. Bought by John Lewis Partnership 1983; renamed John Lewis 1984.
 Wengers (Newcastle upon Tyne) opened in 1960s by Sam Wenger in the former Newcastle and Gateshead Gas Company headquarters. Closed 1983.
 West's (Ilford) - purchased by R H O Hills 1959.
 Wheatley & Whiteley (Leeds)
 Whitakers Opened 1829. Bought by Beales in 1996. Named changed to Beales in 2011. Closed 2018.
 Henry White (Newcastle-under-Lyme)
 Ocky White (Haverfordwest) – established 1910; closed 2013
 W E White & Son (Guildford) – occupied by Marks & Spencer since the 1960s
 Thomas White & Co. (Aldershot) – bought by Army & Navy Stores 1961; renamed Army & Navy; acquired by House of Fraser; closed 1980s
 White & Ellis (Ramsgate)
 R Whitehead & Son (Bolton) – closed 2001
 William Whiteley (London)
 Wickhams (Mile End Road, London)
 Wildings (Newport, Wales)
  Wildings (Thornbury, Gloucestershire)
 Williams & Cox (Torquay) – closed 1982. Building bought by Hoopers and reopened as the first Hoopers store 1982.
 Williams & Griffin (Colchester)
 Williamson & Cole (Clapham)
 Willis Ludlow (Hull)
 Willis Ludlow (Leeds)
 Wills (Rushden and branches) – established in 1922; went into liquidation in 2010
 Wills (Wellingborough) – opened 1936; closed
 Wills (Kettering) – opened 1938; closed 1986
 Wilson (Stockton on Tees) - Opened 1856. Moved to 55 High Street in 1888. Closed 1968.
 G L Wilson (Dundee) – established 1894; closed 1971
 James H Wilson (Crouch End) – bought by Hide & Co.; acquired by House of Fraser 1975; closed
 Walter Wilson & Co. (Glasgow) – established 1873, trading as 'Grand Colosseum'; bought by Dallas's 1936
 Wilson & Co (Brentwood) – established in 1883; building destroyed by fire in 1909 Store re-opened with new grand building and became known as Wilson's Corner. Store closed in 1978. Building now occupied by smaller units and flats.
 Winch & Blatch (Sudbury) –   opened 1850s, closed 2020. Homeware store sold to C J Townrow & Sons.
 Fred Winter (Stratford upon Avon) – opened 1858, closed 2018.
 WS Wood (Colwyn Bay) opened as a ladies clothing shop in 1912, expanded over the next 20 years into a department store. New building by Sidney Colwyn Foulkes completed in 1933. Purchased by Owen Owen. Sold by Owen Owen to Co-op Retail Services. Building as grade II listing.
 Woodward's (Leamington Spa) Opened 1908 on corner of Regent Street and the Parade. Store was closed by then owners Merchant Retail on 31 July 2004, contributing £300,000 profit to the group. The building was sold to Atlantic Property Developments plc who demolished the building in 2005.
 Wood & Selby (Glasgow) - Opened 1880s by James Wood. Purchased by House of Fraser in 1952.
 Woolland Brothers (Knightsbridge) – Established 1869; new building completed 1901. Bought by Debenhams 1949; closed 1967. Building demolished. Site now occupied by The Park Tower Knightsbridge Hotel (2015).
 John Woollright & Co. (Liverpool)
 Wright Brothers (Richmond) – Bought by Hide & Co. 1940. Acquired by House of Fraser 1975. Bought by Owen Owen from House of Fraser 1976; renamed Owen Owen; closed 1990; premises sold to Tesco. Building now occupied by Tesco Metro (2015).
 Wright & Co. (Middlesbrough) – Established in 1862 by Lawrence Wright & Richard Archibald and known as Wrights Tower House. Richard Archibald retired 1895. Refurbished in 1956. Closed in 1986. Building demolished 1987.
 Wylie & Lochhead (Glasgow) – Bought by House of Fraser 1957; merged with McDonalds and together renamed McDonalds, Wylie & Lochhead 1957; renamed Frasers 1975

Y

References

List of department stores of the United Kingdom
List of department stores of the United Kingdom
Department Stores Of The United Kingdom
Department stores
Department stores
Department stores
Retail